Lespedamine is an indole alkaloid and substituted tryptamine present in the plant Lespedeza bicolor. The alkaloid bears a close structural resemblance to the psychedelic alkaloid dimethyltryptamine and was speculated to have psychoactivity by Alexander Shulgin. No reports on lespedamine's biological activity have been published.

References

Tryptamines